Hannah Williams (born 23 April 1998) is a British track and field athlete. She won the bronze medal in the women's 4 × 400 metres relay at the 2018 IAAF World Indoor Championships.

She became British champion when winning the 200 metres event at the 2020 British Athletics Championships in a time of 23.83 secs. Her sister Jodie Williams is a two time British champion.

References

External links

1998 births
Living people
Sportspeople from Welwyn Garden City
British female sprinters
English female sprinters
World Athletics Indoor Championships medalists
British Athletics Championships winners